This is a list of 151 species in Asilus, a genus of robber flies in the family Asilidae.

Asilus species

 Asilus aethiops Pallas, 1771 c g
 Asilus agrius Walker, 1849 c g
 Asilus albifrons (Gmelin, 1790) c g
 Asilus albipilosus Macquart, 1846 c g
 Asilus amphinome Walker, 1849 i g
 Asilus annulatus Fabricius, 1775 c g
 Asilus antiphus Walker, 1849 c g
 Asilus aqualicus (Scopoli, 1763) c g
 Asilus argyrocnemus (Lichtenstein, 1796) c g
 Asilus armatus (Geoffroy, 1785) c g
 Asilus aurimystax Bromley, 1928 c g
 Asilus auripilus Meigen, 1830 c g
 Asilus baikalensis Becker & Schnabl, 1926 c g
 Asilus baletus Walker, 1849 c g
 Asilus barbarus Linnæus, 1758 c g
 Asilus bariventris Rondani, 1850 c g
 Asilus bicinctus Müller, 1776 c g
 Asilus bicolor Olivier, 1789 c g
 Asilus biparitus Macquart, 1849 c g
 Asilus bojus Schrank, 1803 c g
 Asilus bombylius (Lichtenstein, 1796) g
 Asilus caeruleiventris Macquart, 1846 c g
 Asilus calatinus Walker, 1849 c g
 Asilus calidus Fabricius, 1787 g
 Asilus chrysauges Osten Sacken, 1887 c g
 Asilus cinereus (Scopoli, 1763) g
 Asilus claripes Macquart, 1838 c g
 Asilus clavatus Macquart, 1838 c g
 Asilus colombiae Macquart, 1838 c g
 Asilus concepcionensis Bromley, 1932 c g
 Asilus consanguineus Macquart, 1846 c g
 Asilus crabroniformis Linnæus, 1758 c g
 Asilus crassus Bromley, 1932 c g
 Asilus cristatus Wiedemann, 1820 c g
 Asilus culicifromis (Thunberg, 1791) c g
 Asilus cuyanus Lynch Arribalzaga, 1880 c g
 Asilus delector Harris, 1780 c g
 Asilus dioctriaeformis Macquart, 1846 c g
 Asilus enitens Walker, 1871 c g
 Asilus ephippium Macquart, 1855 c g
 Asilus erax Müller, 1776 c g
 Asilus fallaciosus Matsumura, 1916 c g
 Asilus fasciatus Rossi, 1790 c g
 Asilus fasciculatus Villers, 1789 c g
 Asilus ferugineus (Olivier, 1789) c g
 Asilus festivus Meigen, 1835 c g
 Asilus filiferus (Macquart, 1846) c g
 Asilus filiformis Olivier, 1789 c g
 Asilus flavipes Villers, 1789 c g
 Asilus forficula Macquart, 1846 c g
 Asilus fulcratus (Scopoli, 1763) c g
 Asilus fulvopterus Geoffroy, 1785 c g
 Asilus fulvus Rossi, 1790 c g
 Asilus fuscipes Villers, 1789 c g
 Asilus gabonicus Macquart, 1855 c g
 Asilus gamaxus Walker, 1851 c g
 Asilus gavius Walker, 1851 c g
 Asilus gigas (Lichtenstein, 1796) c g
 Asilus glaber Olivier, 1789 c g
 Asilus glaucus Zetterstedt, 1855 c g
 Asilus gracilipes Meigen, 1820 c g
 Asilus harpax (Lichtenstein, 1796) c g
 Asilus hebes Walker, 1855 c g
 Asilus herdonius Walker, 1851 c g
 Asilus heydenii Wiedemann, 1828 c g
 Asilus hilarii Macquart, 1838 c g
 Asilus ignauus Müller, 1764 c g
 Asilus imitator Lynch Arribalzaga, 1883 c g
 Asilus inamatus Walker, 1860 c g
 Asilus lacrymosus (Geoffroy, 1785) c g
 Asilus laetus Wiedemann, 1824 c g
 Asilus lebasii Macquart, 1838 c g
 Asilus leonides Walker, 1851 c g
 Asilus leucopterus (Thunberg, 1789) c g
 Asilus limbipennis Macquart, 1855 c g
 Asilus litoralis Contarini, 1847 c g
 Asilus longicella (Macquart, 1850) c g
 Asilus longiusculus Walker, 1855 c g
 Asilus lucidus Pallas, 1818 c g
 Asilus luctuosus Macquart, 1838 c g
 Asilus lusitanicus (Linnaeus, 1767) c g
 Asilus lutipes Wiedemann, 1828 c g
 Asilus lycorius Walker, 1851 c g
 Asilus maculatus Meigen, 1804 g
 Asilus maculifemora Macquart, 1855 c g
 Asilus marginatus Meigen, 1820 g
 Asilus marginellus Schrank, 1803 c g
 Asilus maurus Linnæus, 1758 c g
 Asilus megastylus Philippi, 1865 c g
 Asilus melanacrus Wiedemann, 1828 c g
 Asilus melanotarsus (Lichtenstein, 1796) c g
 Asilus melanotrichus Brullé, 1833 c g
 Asilus mellipes Wiedemann, 1828 c g
 Asilus minos Wiedemann, 1824 c g
 Asilus misao Macquart, 1855 c g
 Asilus morio (Linnaeus, 1758) g
 Asilus mucronatus Scopoli, 1763 c g
 Asilus natalicus Macquart, 1855 c g
 Asilus nigellus (Lichtenstein, 1796) c g
 Asilus nigerrimus Schrank, 1781 c g
 Asilus nigribarbis Macquart, 1846 c g
 Asilus nigrinus Macquart, 1848 c g
 Asilus nitidus (Lichtenstein, 1796) c g
 Asilus obscurellus (Macquart, 1850) c g
 Asilus occidentalis Philippi, 1865 c g
 Asilus pellopygos (Lichtenstein, 1796) c g
 Asilus peticus Walker, 1849 c g
 Asilus platitarsatus Contarini, 1847 c g
 Asilus poecilopus Philippi, 1865 c g
 Asilus pubescens Gmelin, 1790 c g
 Asilus pumilus Macquart, 1834 c g
 Asilus punctatus Macquart, 1834 c g
 Asilus pusio (Wiedemann, 1819) c g
 Asilus raptor (Lichtenstein, 1796) c g
 Asilus regius (Jaennicke, 1867) c g
 Asilus rufibarbis Macquart, 1850 c g
 Asilus rufipalpis Macquart, 1838 c g
 Asilus russatus (Lichtenstein, 1796) c g
 Asilus sabulosus Contarini, 1847 c g
 Asilus saulcyi Macquart, 1838 c g
 Asilus schaefferi (Geoffroy, 1785) c g
 Asilus schedius Walker, 1849 c g
 Asilus sericans Walker, 1857 c g
 Asilus sericeus Say, 1823 i c g b
 Asilus servillei Macquart, 1834 c g
 Asilus sexmaculatus Walker, 1855 c g
 Asilus striatus Gmelin, 1790 c g
 Asilus superveniens (Walker, 1859) c g
 Asilus tangeri Walker, 1855 c g
 Asilus tarsosus Geffroy, 1785 c g
 Asilus tasmaniae (Macquart, 1838) c g
 Asilus tatius Walker, 1851 c g
 Asilus tenuiventris Macquart, 1855 c g
 Asilus tessellatus Brullé, 1833 c g
 Asilus therevinus Rondani, 1851 c g
 Asilus therimachus Walker, 1851 c g
 Asilus tibialis Pallas, 1818 g
 Asilus tingitanus Boisduval, 1835 c g
 Asilus trifarius Macquart, 1838 c g
 Asilus triopas  g
 Asilus tristis Wiedemann, 1828 c g
 Asilus undulatus (Geoffroy, 1785) c g
 Asilus veriscolor Meigen, 1830 c g
 Asilus villosus Gmelin, 1790 c g
 Asilus viridescens Villers, 1789 c g
 Asilus viridis Geoffroy, 1785 c g
 Asilus vittatus Oliver, 1789 c g
 Asilus willistoni Hine, 1909 i g
 Asilus xanthocerus Williston, 1901 c g

Data sources: i = ITIS, c = Catalogue of Life, g = GBIF, b = Bugguide.net

References

Asilus
Articles created by Qbugbot